Miniestadio de Anoeta, known also as Estadio Kote Olaizola is a sports stadium near to the Anoeta stadium, in San Sebastián.
It is usually used for athletics events. and for trainings. The central pitch, whose surface is natural grass, is occasionally used for football and habitually used for rugby union matches of Bera Bera RT in División de Honor.

The stadium has a main stand with a capacity of 1,262 spectators, a 400m long running track, a 500m long warm-up track, a gym and two multi-purpose rooms

References

External links
Anoeta Stadium webpage 
Bera Bera Rugby Taldea webpage

Athletics (track and field) venues in Spain
Sports venues completed in 1993
Rugby union stadiums in Spain
San Sebastián
Buildings and structures in Gipuzkoa